Argentine singer Lali has released four studio albums, one extended play, two live albums, one soundtrack album, forty-two singles (including nine as a featured artist) and eleven promotional singles. Espósito first appeared on the track "No Digas Nada" for the soundtrack Rincón de Luz in 2003. From 2007 to 2012, the singer was part of the pop-group Teen Angels, derived from the television series Casi Ángeles, which recorded five studio albums, two compilation albums, three live albums and sixteen singles. The albums received gold and platinum certifications in Argentina and Spain. In 2013, one year after the separation of the group, Espósito announced her solo career.

Espósito's debut album, A Bailar, was released on 21 March 2014. The album peaked at No. 5 in Argentina and at No. 3 in Uruguay. It spawned five singles: "A Bailar", "Asesina", "Mil Años Luz", "Del Otro Lado" and "Histeria". In December 2014, Espósito signed a music deal with Sony Music Argentina and released a limited deluxe edition of the album titled A Bailar: Edición Fanpack. Days after, the album received a gold certification by CAPIF for selling 20,000 copies. For the 2015 Gardel Awards the album won in the categories for "Best New Pop Artist Album" and "Best Female Pop Artist Album".

In 2015, the singer appeared on nine of the eleven tracks of the soundtrack for Esperanza Mía, which debuted at No. 1 in Argentina and Uruguay and also received a platinum certification by CAPIF.

"Unico", which was originally intended to be the lead single from her second album, Soy, was released on 20 March 2016. The album's title track, "Soy", which replaced "Unico" as the lead single, was released on 5 May 2016. The album was released on 20 May 2016 and was certified gold by CAPIF a few hours after its release. The record reached the top position on the charts of four countries, including Argentina, Israel, Venezuela and Uruguay, while also entering the top ten in Spain and Italy. Two further singles were released from the album: "Boomerang" and "Ego", the last one becoming Lali's debut single in the United States and Puerto Rico. The album was later certified gold by the Uruguayan Disc Chamber (CUD) for selling over 2,000 copies.

Her third studio album, Brava, was released on 10 August 2018. The album debuted at No. 2 in Argentina and was certified four times platinum by CAPIF. It was preceded by the singles "Una Na", "Tu Novia", "100 Grados" and "Besarte Mucho". Back in February, Espósito collaborated with Mau y Ricky, Karol G, Becky G and Leslie Grace on the remix version of "Mi Mala", which received a triple platinum Latin certification by the Recording Industry Association of America (RIAA). Lali teamed up with Mau y Ricky again for the album's fifth single "Sin Querer Queriendo", which peaked at No. 14 on the Billboard Argentina Hot 100. In 2019, Lali joined Thalía on their single "Lindo Pero Bruto", which peaked at No. 32 on the Billboard Latin Pop Songs chart and was certified gold by RIAA. The final singles from Brava were the Pabllo Vittar-assisted "Caliente", which received a gold certification in Brazil, and "Somos Amantes".

In late 2019, Lali kicked-off her fourth era with the releases of "Laligera" and "Como Así" (featuring boyband CNCO) which peaked at No. 24 and No. 33, respectively, on the Billboard Argentina Hot 100. In 2020, the singles were followed by "Lo Que Tengo Yo" and "Fascinada". She also was featured on songs by Pinto "Wahin", Fito Paez, Los Ángeles Azules and Dvicio. In November 2020, Lali released her fourth studio album, Libra, alongside its fifth single, "Ladrón" in collaboration with Argentine trap singer Cazzu.

After a year away from the music scene, Lali finally made her return with the triple release of "Disciplina", "Diva" and "Como Tú" between January and February 2022. In June, Lali released "N5", with which she earned her first top-ten entry on the Billboard Argentina Hot 100 and her first solo gold certification by CAPIF.

Albums

Studio albums

Live albums

Soundtracks

Extended plays

Singles

As lead artist

As featured artist

Promotional singles

Other appearances

Music videos

Footnotes

Notes for peak chart positions

See also
Teen Angels discography

References

Discography
Pop music discographies
Discographies of Argentine artists
Latin pop music discographies